Conus reductaspiralis, common name Nielsen's cone, is a species of sea snail, a marine gastropod mollusk in the family Conidae, the cone snails and their allies.

Like all species within the genus Conus, these snails are predatory and venomous. They are capable of "stinging" humans, therefore live ones should be handled carefully or not at all.

Notes
Additional information regarding this species:
 Taxonomy: The status of Conus nielsenae, Conus reductaspiralis and Conus thevenardensis has been disputed by some authors, but Australian specialists generally regard them as distinct. For conservation evaluation, all three are here listed as distinct.

Description
The size of the shell varies between 27 mm and 51 mm.

Distribution
This marine species is endemic to Australia and occurs off Western Australia.

References

 Walls, J.G. 1979. Three new Indian Ocean cones. The Pariah 5: 1-8 
 Röckel, D., Korn, W. & Kohn, A.J. 1995. Manual of the Living Conidae. Volume 1: Indo-Pacific Region. Wiesbaden : Hemmen 517 pp.
 Puillandre N., Duda T.F., Meyer C., Olivera B.M. & Bouchet P. (2015). One, four or 100 genera? A new classification of the cone snails. Journal of Molluscan Studies. 81: 1-23

External links
 To World Register of Marine Species
 

reductaspiralis
Gastropods of Australia
Gastropods described in 1979